LZ1 may refer to the following:

 Zeppelin LZ 1, the first Zeppelin rigid airship
 LZ1 (algorithm), a lossless data compression algorithm
 Led Zeppelin (album), the first album by Led Zeppelin
 LZ1 (Lanzarote), a road in the Canary Islands
 2012 LZ1, a Near-Earth Asteroid
 Landing Zone 1, a rocket landing pad operated by SpaceX

See also
 LZI (disambiguation)